Scaeosopha sattleri is a species of moth of the family Cosmopterigidae. It is found in China.

The wingspan is about 25.5 mm.

References

Moths described in 2005
Scaeosophinae